Gavin de Becker and Associates is a security and consulting firm that protects many of the world's most prominent people.  Headquartered in Los Angeles, the company has operations in 27 cities and seven countries.

History
Gavin de Becker and Associates was founded in 1978 by Gavin de Becker. In 2013, GDBA took on TPG Growth as a minority investor. In 2019, Gavin de Becker purchased back 100% of the company.

Services
Gavin de Becker and Associates is a "threat assessment and security firm" that provides private security and also offers protection training courses.

They have provided services to corporations, government agencies, and schools. Clients reportedly include the CIA, FBI, "the 90 most prominent families in the world,"  and over the years, public client references have included Theresa Saldana, Madonna, Cher, Michelle Pfeiffer, Michael J. Fox, Barbra Streisand, Jeff Bezos and John Travolta.

The Private Suite
Gavin de Becker and Associates opened The Private Suite at the Los Angeles Airport on May 15, 2017, which is described by the Wall Street Journal as "a remote terminal for VIPs, celebrities, CEOs," and anyone willing to pay for privacy. Mr. de Becker reported The Private Suite will soon be located at the JFK Airport.

In November 2017, it was reported that Gavin de Becker and Associates opened a version of The Private Suite at the Westfield Century City shopping center, which provides VIP shoppers the opportunity of a private shopping experience.

See also
Bill McGlashan, founder and managing partner of TPG Growth
XOJET

References

External links
 

Security companies of the United States
Security consulting firms
Consulting firms established in 1978